Rebellion is a 2011 French historical drama film directed, produced, co-written, co-edited, and starring Mathieu Kassovitz. Set in New Caledonia in 1988, and filmed in Tahiti, the film is a dramatised version of the Ouvéa cave hostage taking, when four policemen were murdered by separatists and 30 taken hostage. The French government refused to prolong negotiations and French forces stormed the hideout, killing 19 separatists for the loss of two soldiers and freeing all hostages. Kassovitz, Benoît Jaubert and Pierre Geller were collectively nominated for the 2012 Best Writing (Adaptation) César Award.

Plot
In New Caledonia, a French overseas territory, 30 policemen are taken hostage by a group of separatists. GIGN captain Philippe Legorjus is sent to negotiate with the group's leader, Alphonse Dianou. With him are 300 French soldiers who are ready to intervene if his efforts fail to achieve a peaceful solution. Legorjus' task is made more difficult by the differing agendas of Dianou, the army, the separatist organization's leadership and the French government back in Paris.

Cast
 Mathieu Kassovitz as GIGN Captain Philippe Legorjus
 Iabe Lapacas as Alphonse Dianou
 Malik Zidi as JP Perrot
 Alexandre Steiger as Jean Bianconi
 Daniel Martin as Bernard Pons
 Philippe Torreton as Christian Prouteau
 Sylvie Testud as Chantal Legorjus
 Steeve Une as Samy
 Philippe de Jacquelin Dulphé as Brigadier Vidal
 Patrick Fierry as Colonel in the Dubut Army
 Jean-Philippe Puymartin as the commandant of the Gendarmerie Jérôme
 Stefan Godin as Lieutenant Colonel of the Gendarmerie Benson (as Stéfan Godin)

References

External links
 
 

2011 films
2011 drama films
2010s political drama films
2010s French-language films
French political drama films
Films directed by Mathieu Kassovitz
Films scored by Klaus Badelt
Films set in New Caledonia
Films shot in Tahiti
French films based on actual events
Films about terrorism
Films set in the 1980s
GIGN
2010s French films